USS Horne (DLG/CG-30) was a Belknap-class destroyer leader/cruiser, named for Admiral Frederick J. Horne, 1880–1959. She was launched as DLG-30, a destroyer, and reclassified a cruiser on 30 June 1975.

The contract to construct Horne was awarded on 20 September 1961. Her keel was laid down at San Francisco Naval Shipyard on 12 December 1962. She was launched 30 October 1964 and sponsored by Mrs. Frederick Horne, widow of Admiral Horne. She was delivered 7 July 1967 and commissioned on 15 April 1967.

History

1983 deployment 

On 20 July 1983 The New York Times reported that Horne, along with seven other vessels in the Carrier Ranger Battle Group, left San Diego on Friday 15 July 1983 and were headed for the western Pacific when they were rerouted and ordered to steam for Central America to conduct training and flight operations in areas off the coasts of Nicaragua, El Salvador and Honduras as part of major military exercises planned for that summer.

1994 decommissioned 

After more than 26 years of service, Horne was decommissioned on 4 February 1994. She was struck from the register the same day, placed in the custody of the United States Maritime Administration and was laid up at the Suisun Bay National Defense Reserve Fleet. Initially scheduled to be scrapped, she was spared the breakers torch and was sunk as a target on 29 June 2008 as part of RIMPAC 2008.

Horne was the last of the Leahy/Belknap type cruisers.

Unit awards 
The USS Horne (CG-30) and its crewmembers have received the following awards :

External links

USS Horne net
GlobalSecurity.org
NavSource – CG-30
DANFS – Horne

Belknap-class cruisers
Ships built in San Francisco
1964 ships
Gulf War ships of the United States
Cold War cruisers of the United States